Virgilijus Alekna (13 February 1972) is a Lithuanian former discus thrower and politician. He won medals at the 2000, 2004 and 2008 Olympics, including two golds.

After retiring from athletics, Alekna was elected to the national parliament, the Seimas, in 2016.

He has 3 children - Martynas Alekna, Mykolas Alekna and  Gabrielė Aleknaite.

Athletics career
Alekna has won two gold medals in the Summer Olympics in the discus throw, the first was in 2000 and the second in 2004. He also won the bronze medal at the 2008 Beijing Summer Olympics. In 2007, he was appointed as UNESCO Champion for Sport. His personal record as well as the Lithuanian record is 73.88 meters (242 ft 4½ in), surpassed only by the world record (74.08).

Alekna was awarded the title of the Athlete of the Year for 2000 by Track and Field News. He was also awarded the Order of the Lithuanian Grand Duke Gediminas by the government of Lithuania. He became the Lithuanian Sportsman of the Year 4 times (2000, 2004, 2005, and 2006). Since 1995 Alekna has served as a bodyguard of the Lithuanian Prime Minister.

He is married to former long jumper Kristina Sablovskytė-Aleknienė and has two sons named Martynas and Mykolas, also discus throwers.

At a height of 2.00 m (6 ft 7 in), Alekna has an unusually long armspan, measured 2.24m (7 ft 4 in), which is helpful in discus throwing.  He can make fingerprints on windows of two opposite sides of a bus simultaneously.

During the 2007 World Championship Virgilijus Alekna competed with an injury. Having sustained the injury on 20 August, he competed in the World Championship's qualification on 28 August and, as a result, suffered a defeat, which broke his 37 victories in a row over the past two years. In 2017 Alekna was awarded the European Athletics Lifetime Achievement award.

Political career

In May 2016, Alekna announced he would participate in the elections to the Seimas the following October on the electoral list of the opposition Liberal Movement, without joining the party. He lost the run-off in Naujamiestis single-member constituency, but was elected to the Twelfth Seimas through the electoral list of the party, where he was rated second.

References

External links

 
 
 
 
 
 
 
 ALEKNA biography rzutyiskoki.pl

1972 births
Living people
Lithuanian male discus throwers
Athletes (track and field) at the 1996 Summer Olympics
Athletes (track and field) at the 2000 Summer Olympics
Athletes (track and field) at the 2004 Summer Olympics
Athletes (track and field) at the 2008 Summer Olympics
Athletes (track and field) at the 2012 Summer Olympics
European Athletics Championships medalists
Lithuanian Sportsperson of the Year winners
Lithuanian masters athletes
Medalists at the 2000 Summer Olympics
Medalists at the 2004 Summer Olympics
Medalists at the 2008 Summer Olympics
Olympic athletes of Lithuania
Olympic bronze medalists for Lithuania
Olympic gold medalists for Lithuania
Recipients of the Order of the Lithuanian Grand Duke Gediminas
World Athletics Championships athletes for Lithuania
World Athletics Championships medalists
World record holders in masters athletics
Olympic gold medalists in athletics (track and field)
Olympic bronze medalists in athletics (track and field)
Members of the Seimas
21st-century Lithuanian politicians
Goodwill Games medalists in athletics
European Athlete of the Year winners
Recipients of the European Athletics Lifetime Achievement Award
Track & Field News Athlete of the Year winners
Diamond League winners
World Athletics Championships winners
IAAF World Athletics Final winners
Competitors at the 2001 Goodwill Games
Lithuanian Sports University alumni